Yaran Ghadir Alborz Football Club is an Iranian football team based in Hashtgerd, Iran.

Football clubs in Iran